In the mathematical field of topology, a uniform space is a set with a uniform structure. Uniform spaces are topological spaces with additional structure that is used to define uniform properties such as completeness, uniform continuity and uniform convergence. Uniform spaces generalize metric spaces and topological groups, but the concept is designed to formulate the weakest axioms needed for most proofs in analysis.

In addition to the usual properties of a topological structure, in a uniform space one formalizes the notions of relative closeness and closeness of points.  In other words, ideas like "x is closer to a than y is to b" make sense in uniform spaces.  By comparison, in a general topological space, given sets A,B it is meaningful to say that a point x is arbitrarily close to A (i.e., in the closure of A), or perhaps that A is a smaller neighborhood of x than B, but notions of closeness of points and relative closeness are not described well by topological structure alone.

Definition
There are three equivalent definitions for a uniform space.  They all consist of a space equipped with a uniform structure.

Entourage definition

This definition adapts the presentation of a topological space in terms of neighborhood systems.
 If  then  where  is the diagonal on 
 If  and  then 
 If  and  then 
 If  then  where  is the inverse of 

The non-emptiness of  taken together with (2) and (3) states that  is a filter on  If the last property is omitted we call the space .

On a graph, a typical entourage is drawn as a blob surrounding the "" diagonal; all the different 's form the vertical cross-sections. An entourage  is  if  precisely when  The first axiom states that each point is -close to itself for each entourage  The third axiom guarantees that being "both -close and -close" is also a closeness relation in the uniformity. The fourth axiom states that for each entourage  there is an entourage  that is "not more than half as large".

Intuition about uniformities is provided by the example of metric spaces: if  is a metric space, the sets

A uniformity  is finer than another uniformity  on the same set if  in that case  is said to be coarser than

Pseudometrics definition

Uniform spaces may be defined alternatively and equivalently using systems of pseudometrics, an approach that is particularly useful in functional analysis (with pseudometrics provided by seminorms). More precisely, let  be a pseudometric on a set  The inverse images  for  can be shown to form a fundamental system of entourages of a uniformity.

For a family  of pseudometrics on  the uniform structure defined by the family is the least upper bound of the uniform structures defined by the individual pseudometrics  A fundamental system of entourages of this uniformity is provided by the set of finite intersections of entourages of the uniformities defined by the individual pseudometrics  If the family of pseudometrics is finite, it can be seen that the same uniform structure is  defined by a single pseudometric, namely the upper envelope  of the family.

Less trivially, it can be shown that a uniform structure that admits a countable fundamental system of entourages (hence in particular a uniformity defined by a countable family of pseudometrics) can be defined by a single pseudometric. A consequence is that any uniform structure can be defined as above by a (possibly uncountable) family of pseudometrics (see Bourbaki: General Topology Chapter IX §1 no. 4).

Uniform cover definition

A uniform space  is a set  equipped with a distinguished family of coverings  called "uniform covers", drawn from the set of coverings of  that form a filter when ordered by star refinement. One says that a cover  is a star refinement of cover  written  if for every  there is a  such that if  then  Axiomatically, the condition of being a filter reduces to:

  is a uniform cover (that is).
 If  with  a uniform cover and  a cover of  then  is also a uniform cover.

Given a uniform space in the entourage sense, define a cover  to be uniform if there is some entourage  such that for each  there is an  such that  These uniform covers form a uniform space as in the second definition. Moreover, these two transformations are inverses of each other.

Topology of uniform spaces

Every uniform space  becomes a topological space by defining a subset  to be open if and only if for every  there exists an entourage  such that  is a subset of  In this topology, the neighbourhood filter of a point  is  This can be proved with a recursive use of the existence of a "half-size" entourage.

The topology defined by a uniform structure is said to be . A uniform structure on a topological space is compatible with the topology if the topology defined by the uniform structure coincides with the original topology. In general several different uniform structures can be compatible with a given topology on

Uniformizable spaces

A topological space is called  if there is a uniform structure compatible with the topology.

Every uniformizable space is a completely regular topological space. Moreover, for a uniformizable space  the following are equivalent: 
  is a Kolmogorov space
  is a Hausdorff space
  is a Tychonoff space
 for any compatible uniform structure, the intersection of all entourages is the diagonal 
Some authors (e.g. Engelking) add this last condition directly in the definition of a uniformizable space.

The topology of a uniformizable space is always a symmetric topology; that is, the space is an R0-space.

Conversely, each completely regular space is uniformizable. A uniformity compatible with the topology of a completely regular space  can be defined as the coarsest uniformity that makes all continuous real-valued functions on  uniformly continuous.

In particular, a compact Hausdorff space is uniformizable. In fact, for a compact Hausdorff space  the set of all neighbourhoods of the diagonal in  form the unique uniformity compatible with the topology.

A Hausdorff uniform space is metrizable if its uniformity can be defined by a countable family of pseudometrics. Indeed, as discussed above, such a uniformity can be defined by a single pseudometric, which is necessarily a metric if the space is Hausdorff. In particular, if the topology of a vector space is Hausdorff and definable by a countable family of seminorms, it is metrizable.

Uniform continuity

Similar to continuous functions between topological spaces, which preserve topological properties, are the uniformly continuous functions between uniform spaces, which preserve uniform properties. 

A uniformly continuous function is defined as one where inverse images of entourages are again entourages, or equivalently, one where the inverse images of uniform covers are again uniform covers.

All uniformly continuous functions are continuous with respect to the induced topologies. 

Uniform spaces with uniform maps form a category.
A  is an injective uniformly continuous map  between uniform spaces whose inverse  is also uniformly continuous, where the image  has the subspace uniformity inherited from

Completeness

Generalizing the notion of complete metric space, one can also define completeness for uniform spaces. Instead of working with Cauchy sequences, one works with Cauchy filters (or Cauchy nets).

A  (respectively, a )  on a uniform space  is a filter (respectively, a prefilter)  such that for every entourage  there exists  with  In other words, a filter is Cauchy if it contains "arbitrarily small" sets. It follows from the definitions that each filter that converges (with respect to the topology defined by the uniform structure) is a Cauchy filter.
A  is a Cauchy filter that does not contain any smaller (that is, coarser) Cauchy filter (other than itself). It can be shown that every Cauchy filter contains a unique . The neighbourhood filter of each point (the filter consisting of all neighbourhoods of the point) is a minimal Cauchy filter.

Conversely, a uniform space is called  if every Cauchy filter converges. Any compact Hausdorff space is a complete uniform space with respect to the unique uniformity compatible with the topology.

Complete uniform spaces enjoy the following important property: if  is a uniformly continuous function from a dense subset  of a uniform space  into a complete uniform space  then  can be extended (uniquely) into a uniformly continuous function on all of 

A topological space that can be made into a complete uniform space, whose uniformity induces the original topology, is called a completely uniformizable space.

A   is a complete is a pair  consisting of a complete uniform space  and a uniform embedding  whose image  is a dense subset of

Hausdorff completion of a uniform space

As with metric spaces, every uniform space  has a : that is, there exists a complete Hausdorff uniform space  and a uniformly continuous map  (if  is a Hausdorff uniform space then  is a topological embedding) with the following property:

 for any uniformly continuous mapping  of  into a complete Hausdorff uniform space  there is a unique uniformly continuous map  such that 

The Hausdorff completion  is unique up to isomorphism.

The sets  can be shown to form a fundamental system of entourages;  is equipped with the uniform structure thus defined.

The set  is then a dense subset of   If  is Hausdorff, then   is an isomorphism onto  and thus  can be identified with a dense subset of its completion. Moreover,  is always Hausdorff; it is called the   If  denotes the equivalence relation  then the quotient space  is homeomorphic to

Examples

 Every metric space  can be considered as a uniform space. Indeed, since a metric is a fortiori a pseudometric, the pseudometric definition furnishes  with a uniform structure. A fundamental system of entourages of this uniformity is provided by the setsThis uniform structure on  generates the usual metric space topology on  However, different metric spaces can have the same uniform structure (trivial example is provided by a constant multiple of a metric). This uniform structure produces also equivalent definitions of uniform continuity and completeness for metric spaces.
 Using metrics, a simple example of distinct uniform structures with coinciding topologies can be constructed.
One may also define a left uniformity on  the two need not coincide, but they both generate the given topology on 
 For every topological group  and its subgroup  the set of left cosets  is a uniform space with respect to the uniformity  defined as follows.
 The trivial topology belongs to a uniform space in which the whole cartesian product  is the only entourage.

History

Before André Weil gave the first explicit definition of a uniform structure in 1937, uniform concepts, like completeness, were discussed using metric spaces. Nicolas Bourbaki provided the definition of uniform structure in terms of entourages in the book Topologie Générale and John Tukey gave the uniform cover definition. Weil also characterized uniform spaces in terms of a family of pseudometrics.

See also

References

 Nicolas Bourbaki, General Topology (Topologie Générale),  (Ch. 1–4),  (Ch. 5–10): Chapter II is a comprehensive reference of uniform structures, Chapter IX § 1 covers pseudometrics, and Chapter III § 3 covers uniform structures on topological groups
 Ryszard Engelking, General Topology. Revised and completed edition, Berlin 1989. 
 John R. Isbell, Uniform Spaces 
 I. M. James, Introduction to Uniform Spaces 
 I. M. James, Topological and Uniform Spaces 
 John Tukey, Convergence and Uniformity in Topology; 
 André Weil, Sur les espaces à structure uniforme et sur la topologie générale, Act. Sci. Ind. 551, Paris, 1937